Fred Hersch (born October 21, 1955) is an American jazz pianist, educator and HIV/AIDS activist. He was the first person to play weeklong engagements as a solo pianist at the Village Vanguard in New York City. He has recorded more than 70 of his jazz compositions. Hersch has been nominated for several Grammy Awards, and, as of December 2014, had been on the Jazz Studies faculty of the New England Conservatory since 1980 (with breaks).

Early life
Hersch was born in Cincinnati, Ohio, to Jewish parents. He began playing the piano at the age of four (under the tutelage of Jeanne Kirstein) and began to compose music by eight. He won national piano competitions starting at the age of ten.

Hersch first became interested in jazz while at Grinnell College in Iowa. He dropped out of school and started playing jazz in Cincinnati. He continued his studies at the New England Conservatory under Jaki Byard, attracting attention from the press – "a fine showcase for Fred Hersch" – in a college recital. On graduation, he became a jazz piano instructor at the college.

In his 2017 autobiography, Good Things Happen Slowly: A Life In and Out of Jazz, Hersch talks about seeing Sun Ra and his Intergalactic Arkestra at Gilly's a now closed jazz club in Dayton, Ohio. Hersch recalls being in the audience when bandleader Art Pepper kicked the pianist hired for the occasion off the stand and asked if there was anyone in the audience who could sit in, an offer that Fred took up which essentially launched his career.

Career
In 1977, Hersch moved to New York. One of Fred Hersch's earliest professional engagements was with Art Farmer in Los Angeles in 1978. Jazz critic Leonard Feather wrote that he "showed his ability as an accompanist and soloist at the out-of-tune piano". He played with Farmer again in 1981. In 1982, the album A Work of Art (Art Farmer Quartet, Concord Jazz CJ-179), was released, with Hersch on piano. It included two original compositions by Hersch. Leonard Feather gave it 3½ stars.

In 1980, the Fred Hersch Trio played at B. Dalton Bookseller, one of many fringe events that were an offshoot of the Newport Jazz Festival. The following year, his trio played for singer Chris Connor, who was making a comeback after completing a recovery program for alcoholism. He played at the Kool Jazz Festival, and with Joe Henderson in the New Jazz at the Public series in the same year.

In 1983, Hersch played a duo session with bassist Ratzo Harris at the Knickerbocker Saloon, New York. The New York Times wrote: "Mr. Hersch is a romantic. He is openly involved in what he is playing and projects this involvement with body English and facial expressions that subtly underline the sense of his music. His lines often become gently billowing waves of sound, and he rises and falls, tenses and relaxes along with them."

In 1983–84, Hersch played many sessions with Jane Ira Bloom in several venues, and with whom he recorded the album, Mighty Lights. In 1985, he played with the Jamie Baum Quartet.

In 1986, he played with Toots Thielemans at the Great Woods jazz festival. He played with him in several sessions the following year, and again in 1987, receiving special attention for his solos.  In 1986, he taught at Berklee College of Music.

He was the pianist for the Eddie Daniels quartet in 1987 and appeared on his album, To Bird with Love.

In 1988, Hersch played in Somerville, Massachusetts with his quintet at the Willow Jazz Club. The Boston Globe described him as "an elegant, highly melodic player."

In 1989, Hersch played with Janis Siegel of The Manhattan Transfer and they recorded together in a studio set up in his home. His first solo piano recording came in 1993: Fred Hersch at Maybeck.

In 2006, Palmetto Records released the solo CD Fred Hersch in Amsterdam: Live at the Bimhuis, and released his eighth solo disc, Fred Hersch Plays Jobim, in 2009.

Composing
Hersch's career as a performer has been enhanced by his activities as a composer, which are an important part of nearly all of his concerts and recordings. He has received commissions from the Gilmore Keyboard Festival, the Doris Duke Foundation, the Miller Theatre at Columbia University, the Gramercy Trio and the Brooklyn Youth Chorus. A disc of his through-composed works, Fred Hersch: Concert Music 2001-2006, was released by Naxos Records.

Many of Hersch's compositions have been transcribed by music publisher Edition Peters. These include Valentine, Three Character Studies, Saloon Songs, and 24 Variations on a Bach Chorale.

Hersch was awarded a 2003 Guggenheim Memorial Fellowship for composition. In the same year, he created Leaves of Grass (Palmetto Records), a large-scale setting of Walt Whitman's poetry for two voices (Kurt Elling and Kate McGarry) and an instrumental octet; the work was presented in March 2005 at Zankel Hall at Carnegie Hall as part of a six-city U.S. tour.

Accompanist
Hersch has worked with instrumentalists and vocalists in the worlds of jazz (Joe Henderson, Charlie Haden, Art Farmer, Stan Getz and Bill Frisell); classical (Renée Fleming, Dawn Upshaw, Joshua Bell, Christopher O'Riley, Nadja Salerno-Sonnenberg); and Broadway (Audra McDonald). Hersch has accompanied jazz vocalists such as Nancy King, Norma Winstone and Kurt Elling.

Hersch has taught at The New School and Manhattan School of Music, and conducted a Professional Training Workshop for Young Musicians at The Weill Institute at Carnegie Hall in 2008.

Awards and honors
 Académie Charles Cros
 Guggenheim Memorial Fellowship in Composition, 2003
 Coup de coeur for Alone at the Vanguard, 2011
 Grand Prix du Disque for Alive at the Vanguard, 2012
 Pianist of the Year, Jazz Journalists Association, 2011, 2016, 2018
 Pianist of the Year, DownBeat magazine Critics' Poll, 2015
 Artiste étranger de l'année, Jazz magazine in France, 2015
 Grand Prix du Disque de l'Académie du Jazz, Solo, 2015
 Honorary Doctor of Musical Arts, Northern Kentucky University, 2015
 Doris Duke Performing Artist Award 2016
 Honorary Doctor of Humane Letters, Grinnell College, 2016
 Prix Honorem in Jazz and Coup de cœur jazz, 2017
 Book of the Year about Jazz, Good Things Happen Slowly, Jazz Journalists Association, 2018
 Hersch has been awarded a Rockefeller Fellowship, grants from Chamber Music America, the National Endowment for the Arts, Meet the Composer, and seven composition residencies at the MacDowell Colony.

Grammy Award nominations
Art Farmer's A Work of Art in 1983 and two of Eddie Daniels' albums with Hersch in 1986 and 1987 preceded Short Stories, a collaboration between Janis Siegel and Hersch, co-led and co-produced with arrangements by Hersch, that got a nomination for her vocal performance in 1989. In 1992 finally Dancing in the Dark, his seventh trio recording and second for Chesky Records, was nominated for Best Jazz Instrumental Performance.
 1992: Best Jazz Instrumental Performance, Individual or Group for Dancing in the Dark
 1995: Best Jazz Instrumental Performance, Individual or Group for his solo album I Never Told You: Fred Hersch Plays Johnny Mandel
 2005: Best Instrumental Composition for "Valentine" (on In Amsterdam: Live at the Bimhuis)
 2011: Best Jazz Instrumental Album for Alone at the Vanguard, and Best Improvised Jazz Solo for "Work"
 2013: Best Improvised Jazz Solo for "Song Without Words No.4: Duet" with Julian Lage
 2014: Best Jazz Instrumental Album for Floating (as the Fred Hersch Trio), and Best Improvised Jazz Solo for "You and the Night and the Music"
 2016: Best Jazz Instrumental Album for Sunday Night at the Vanguard, and Best Improvised Jazz Solo for "We See"
 2017: Best Jazz Instrumental Album for Open Book, and Best Improvised Jazz Solo for "Whisper Not"
 2018: Best Jazz Instrumental Album and Best Improvised Jazz Solo for another interpretation of "We See"

Critical response
DownBeat magazine described Hersch as "one of the small handful of brilliant musicians of his generation." The New York Times described him as "singular among the trailblazers of their art, a largely unsung innovator of this borderless, individualistic jazz – a jazz for the 21st century."

Influence
Hersch's influence has been widely felt on a new generation of jazz pianists, from former Hersch students including Brad Mehldau, Ethan Iverson, Sullivan Fortner, Aaron Diehl and Dan Tepfer to his contemporary Jason Moran, who said: "Fred at the piano is like LeBron James on the basketball court. He's perfection."

Gallery

Personal life

Illness
In 1993, Hersch came out as gay and that he had been treated for HIV since 1984. He fell into a coma in 2008 for two months. When he regained consciousness, he had lost all muscular function as a result of his long inactivity and could not play the piano. After rehabilitation, he was able to play again. In 2011, he performed My Coma Dreams, a stage show written and directed by Herschel Garfein about the contrast between dreams and reality.

Charity work
Hersch has been a spokesman and fund-raiser for AIDS services and education agencies since 1993. Hersch has produced and performed on four benefit recordings and in numerous concerts for charities including Classical Action: Performing Arts Against AIDS and Broadway Cares/Equity Fights AIDS which had raised over $250,000 as of June 2013. In April 2016, he played a benefit concert for Buddhist Global Relief. He has also been the keynote speaker and performer at international medical conferences.

Autobiography
Good Things Happen Slowly: A Life In and Out of Jazz, Published 2017

Discography

As leader/co-leader 
(Artists and labels are only linked once at first appearance. Line-up can be sorted by "solo", "duo", "trio"... All trios are classic piano trios with (grand) piano, upright bass and drum kit, except for the trio Thirteen Ways with saxophonist Michael Moore.). Retrieved January 19, 2019

As sideman/featured soloist

See also
 List of jazz pianists

References

External links
 Official website
  "Let Yourself Go - The Lives of Fred Hersch", documentary about Fred Hersch on DVD
 "In Conversation with Fred Hersch" (Jazz.com)
 Live' With The Fred Hersch Pocket Orchestra By Kevin Whitehead - NPR Fresh Air"
 Video of Fred Hersch, NEC
 DTM interview
Film - The Ballad of Fred Hersch
 Course - Thoughts and Experiments with Solo Piano - Open Studio

1955 births
Living people
Musicians from Cincinnati
Grinnell College alumni
New England Conservatory alumni
American jazz pianists
American male pianists
People with HIV/AIDS
Manhattan School of Music faculty
New England Conservatory faculty
People from Cincinnati
Western Michigan University faculty
Palmetto Records artists
Chesky Records artists
American gay musicians
LGBT people from Ohio
20th-century American pianists
Jazz musicians from Ohio
21st-century American pianists
20th-century American male musicians
21st-century American male musicians
American male jazz musicians
JMT Records artists
Nonesuch Records artists
Sunnyside Records artists
Jewish American musicians
20th-century American LGBT people
21st-century LGBT people
21st-century American Jews